Angelis is a British classical singing group of young choristers.

Angelis may also refer to:

People 
 Angelis Angeli (born 1989), Cypriot professional footballer
 Angelis Borges, contestant on the Brazilian reality television show Fazenda de Verão
 Angelis Gatsos (1771–1839), Slavophone Greek military commander
 Angelis Govios (1780–1822), leader of the Greek War of Independence
 Apostolos Angelis (born 1993), cross-country skier from Greece
 Michael Angelis (1944–2020), British actor
 Odysseas Angelis (1912–1987), Greek military officer
 Paul Angelis (born 1943), British actor
 Peter Angelis (1685–1734), French painter
 Talbot Angelis, fictional character of the American television drama series True Blood
 Tom Angelis, Maryland political candidate
 Vasilis Angelis (born 1980), Greek composer, engineer, and producer

Other uses 
 Angelis (album), the debut album from  Angelis

See also
 Angeli (disambiguation)
 Angelus
 Vangelis (born 1943), Greek musician
 Angela (given name)
 De Angelis